The Rantau Panjang railway station was a Malaysian railway station located near Jalan Besar and named after the town of Rantau Panjang, Kelantan. Opened in 1921, it is located on the Rantau Panjang branch line, branching off from the main KTM East Coast Line at Pasir Mas. Rantau Panjang is one of the two rail border crossings on the border with Thailand (the other is Padang Besar railway station in Perlis), though currently there is no cross-border train crossing the Malaysia–Thailand border at Rantau Panjang. The Thai entrance to the Harmony rail bridge is currently sealed off by the Royal Thai Army.

Services
Currently, there is no train service to the station. It was previously served by both Keretapi Tanah Melayu and State Railway of Thailand trains. Later, Thai diesel multiple units (DMUs) took up the entire schedule, which rose unexpected numbers of passengers, resulting in protests by the railcar drivers against terminating the DMU services at Wakaf Bharu and Tumpat. The protests led to the discontinuation of the cross-border SRT services and the station fell into disuse.

Trains between Malaysia and Thailand cross the border at Padang Besar railway station in Perlis, on the western branch of the Malaysian network.

2008 flooding between Pondok Tanjung and Bukit Merah, Malaysia
During some flash floods in certain parts of Malaysia in 2008, the station and its railway tracks served as an emergency route for the Eastern and Oriental Express trains, through Su-ngai Kolok, when the Pondok Tanjung–Bukit Merah part of the mainline were unusable causing a direct divert. After the diversions, the station and the tracks went back to their current state.

See also
 Rantau Panjang–Sungai Golok Bridge

References

Pasir Mas District
Railway stations opened in 1921
Railway stations in Kelantan
KTM East Coast Line stations